M74 or M-74 may refer to:

 M74 light mortar
 M74 motorway, a motorway in Scotland
 Messier 74, a spiral galaxy in the constellation Pisces
 M74 rocket, an incendiary rocket for a shoulder-fired M202A1 FLASH launcher
 M74 Armored Recovery Vehicle, a variant of the M4 Sherman tank
 M-74 (Michigan highway), a former state highway in Michigan
 M74 syndrome, a disease prevalent in Baltic salmon